The Final Impulse is a 1914 American silent short drama film directed by Thomas Ricketts starring Winifred Greenwood, Ed Coxen, George Field, and Charlotte Burton.

Cast
 Winifred Greenwood as Marian
 Ed Coxen as Jack
 George Field as Woodley, a stranger
 Charlotte Burton as Ruth
 Perry Banks as Ruth's father
 William Bertram as Darby, a blacksmith
 Grace Thompson as Little Helen, his child
 John Steppling as Foreman

External links

1914 films
1914 drama films
Silent American drama films
American silent short films
American black-and-white films
1914 short films
Films directed by Tom Ricketts
1910s American films